Thazhathangady Juma Masjid is a mosque situated in Thazhathangady, one of the Heritage Zonesof Kerala, India, near the town of Kottayam. It is one of the oldest mosques in India and is more than 1000 years old. It is famous for its richness of architecture, wood carvings and the beauty. Southern half of it is demolished and extended with iron pillars, aluminium sheets and minars in 2012.

This mosque is situated on the banks of the Meenachil river.

Thazhathangady Juma Masjid is also called as the "Taj Juma Masjid". The ancestors of this Masjid came and settled in Kottayam, from different parts of Kerala. The Muslims who lived here played an active role in Freedom Struggle and other National Movements.

This mosque is known for its intricate wooden carvings and architecture.

As per the latest update Thazhathangady Juma Masjid in Kerala's Kotayam has opened its doors for women devotees. "Muslim women in the right attire can enter the mosque only on the two days, April 24 and May 8, as  decided by the committee," said Moulavi Sirajjuddeen Hasni, the chief imam.

Thazhathangady Muslim Cultural Forum (TMCF)

Established on 20 June 2017, Thazhathangady Muslim Cultural Forum (TMCF) is a social organisation located in the Thazhathangady region of Kottayam district, Kerala, India. TMCF is committed towards bringing holistic development for the Muslim community located at Thazhathangady. TMCF strides ahead by upholding its motto: ‘Material Progress ingrained in Spirituality’. Within a short stint TMCF has been heralded as a prestigious organisation capable of bringing forth decisive transformation among its stakeholders. TMCF gyrates on areas like education, culture, charity and the like.

References

External links
 Thazhathangady Muslim Cultural Forum (TMCF) Thazhathangady Muslim Cultural Forum (TMCF) 
 Thazhathangady Juma Masjid Kerala Tourism Page

Mosques in Kerala
Religious buildings and structures in Kottayam district
Thazhathangady
Tourist attractions in Kottayam district